Reina Hispanoamericana 2017 was the 27th edition of the Reina Hispanoamericana pageant. It was held on 4 November 2017 at the Salón Sirionó, Fexpocruz in Santa Cruz de la Sierra, Bolivia. Maria Camilla Soleibe of Colombia crowned Teresita Marquez of the Philippines as her successor at the end of the event. 27 contestants competed for the crown.

Results

Placements

Order of Announcements
Top 10

Winning answer
Final question:
"How will you promote the Hispanic-American culture with the great difficulty or barrier of language?"

Winning answer:

Candidates

References

 http://www.gmanetwork.com/news/lifestyle/content/631972/winwyn-marquez-is-reina-hispanoamericana-2017/story/
 http://www.gmanetwork.com/news/lifestyle/content/631970/winwyn-s-well-thought-of-answer-at-the-first-q-amp-a-portion-of-reina-hispanoamericana/story/

Reina Hispanoamericana
2017 beauty pageants
Events in Santa Cruz de la Sierra